Ricardo Alves Pereira  (born August 8, 1988 in Sinop, Mato Grosso), or simply Ricardinho, is a Brazilian footballer who currently plays for Ben Guerdane.

Club career
He made his professional debut with Clube Atlético Paranaense in a 4-2 home victory against São Paulo on August 20, 2005 in the Campeonato Brasileiro. On 24 July 2007 FC Dallas announced that Ricardinho has signed for them on loan on 5 June 2007. He made his debut for Dallas against Mexican Primera División side UANL Tigres on 7 July.

International career
Ricardinho has played for Brazil at Under 16, Under 17, Under 18 and Under 20 level.

Contract
Atlético-PR 1 June 2007 to 31 May 2012

References

External links

1988 births
Living people
Brazilian footballers
Brazilian expatriate footballers
Expatriate soccer players in the United States
Expatriate footballers in Japan
Expatriate footballers in South Korea
Expatriate footballers in Tunisia
Expatriate footballers in Saudi Arabia
Brazilian expatriate sportspeople in the United States
Brazilian expatriate sportspeople in Japan
Brazilian expatriate sportspeople in South Korea
Brazilian expatriate sportspeople in Tunisia
Brazilian expatriate sportspeople in Saudi Arabia
Campeonato Brasileiro Série A players
Campeonato Brasileiro Série B players
Tunisian Ligue Professionnelle 1 players
Saudi First Division League players
J1 League players
Major League Soccer players
K League 1 players
Association football forwards
Club Athletico Paranaense players
FC Dallas players
ABC Futebol Clube players
FC Tokyo players
Associação Atlética Ponte Preta players
Figueirense FC players
América Futebol Clube (MG) players
Daejeon Hana Citizen FC players
Clube de Regatas Brasil players
Londrina Esporte Clube players
Uberlândia Esporte Clube players
Esporte Clube Taubaté players
US Ben Guerdane players
Al-Ansar FC (Medina) players